Dima Wawi (born November 20, 2003) was the youngest Palestinian prisoner in Israeli jails. She was released on April 24, 2016 after 75 days on charges of allegedly trying to stab a Jewish man at the main entrance of Karmei Tzur.

After waking and making coffee for her brothers she left her home at 7:40 AM. She walked down a road separating her village from the Jewish village in question. When her mother and brothers noticed that Dima was missing they assumed that she had gone on to school.

Arriving at the main entrance Dima accosted a civilian who turned in her direction. Allegedly they saw Dima holding a large knife he quickly pulled out his pistol and ordered her to drop the knife and lie on the ground. Dina immediately complied.

Later, her mother released a statement that said "Although I selfishly prayed that it was someone else's daughter, that another mother would claim the little girl in the photo, it was unmistakable. Dima lay blindfold with her face violently shoved against the pavement. A settler's foot was rammed against her back and a gun was pointed at her head. The photos and videos were taken near the illegal settlement of Karmi Tsur [ ... ] I held my tears, for I would not give the occupier the pleasure of victory over a child who was barely 12 years old. Even though Dima was twelve years old at the time, she spent four and a half months in Israeli prison. She was released on April 24, 2016.

Arrest
On February 9, 2016 Wawi was arrested near the Karmi Tzur settlement next to the Arab village of Halhoul Halhul, north of Hebron. She was transferred to Hasharon Prison on charges of alleged attempted murder. The day after her arrest the prosecutor had her transferred her to a therapeutic community for troubled adolescents. The program is under the auspices of the Ministry of Social Affairs, with the payment of a fine of 8,000 shekels. She was assigned bail of 25 thousand shekels.

Trial
The Israeli court in Ofer sentenced her to four months, to be served in the therapeutic community that she had already been transferred to. In the end, she spent 75 days in custody.

Released
On April 24, 2016 Wawi was released.

References

2003 births
Palestinian women
Living people